Dive is the third studio album by English soprano Sarah Brightman.  It is her first album with producer Frank Peterson, and a marked departure from her previous operatic works. Its unifying theme is water and the ocean. Four of the songs are covers: "Captain Nemo" was originally recorded in 1990 by Dive; "A Salty Dog" in 1969 by Procol Harum; and "Johnny Wanna Live" in 1992 by Sandra. Likewise, "Once in a Lifetime" is a cover of the Gregorian song from 1991's Sadisfaction, also produced by Frank Peterson, though with different lyrics alluding to BDSM.

Track listing

Singles
 "Captain Nemo" (1993)
 "The Second Element" (1993)

Personnel 

A.L.W. – background vocals
Sarah Brightman – keyboards, vocals, background vocals, producer
Dave Collins – mastering
Udo Dahmen – percussion, drums
Simon Fowler – photography
Matt Howe – engineer, overdub engineer
Ben Huellenkremer – bass
Gunther Laudahn – guitar, background vocals
Tom Leonhardt – guitar
The London Community Gospel Choir – background vocals
Matthias Meissner – arranger, keyboards
Frank Peterson – percussion, arranger, drums, keyboards, background vocals, producer, engineer, mixing
Thomas Schwarz – guitar, arranger, background vocals
Stylorouge – art direction, design
Michael Wehr – arranger, keyboards, background vocals, producer, engineer, mixing, digital engineer, audio frame systems operator, digital system operator
Peter Weihe – guitar
Koba Yashi – engineer, overdub engineer

Chart

References

Sarah Brightman albums
1993 debut albums
Albums produced by Frank Peterson
A&M Records albums